The 1997 Hall of Fame Tennis Championships (also known as 1997 Miller Lite Hall of Fame Championships for sponsorship reasons) was a men's tennis tournament played on grass courts at the International Tennis Hall of Fame in Newport, Rhode Island in the United States and was part of the World Series of the 1997 ATP Tour. It was the 22nd edition of the tournament and was held from July 7 through July 13, 1997. Fifth-seeded Sargis Sargsian won the singles title.

Finals

Singles

 Sargis Sargsian defeated  Brett Steven 7–6(7–0), 4–6, 7–5 
 It was Sargsian's only singles title of his career.

Doubles

 Justin Gimelstob /  Brett Steven defeated  Kent Kinnear /  Aleksandar Kitinov 6–3, 6–4

References

External links
 Official website
 ATP tournament profile
 ITF tournament edition details

 
Miller Lite Hall of Fame Championships
Hall of Fame Tennis Championships
Hall of Fame Tennis Championships
Hall of Fame Tennis Championships
Hall of Fame Open